Ravindra Kumar (born 1959) is a Political Scientist, Peace Educator, an Indologist, a Humanist, Cultural Anthropologist and a former Vice-Chancellor of CCS University, Meerut (India).

He has worked an Ombudsman of Swami Vivekananda Subharati University, Meerut and the editor-in-chief of  Global Peace International Journal. He has written more than one hundred books and four hundred articles on greatest personalities of the Indian sub-continent, especially Gautama Buddha, Swami Vivekananda, Mahatma Gandhi, Sardar Vallabhbhai Patel and on various social, political, educational, cultural and academic issues to his credit.

Early life and education
Born in 1959 at Kakrauli village of Muzaffarnagar district in Uttar Pradesh, India, he is M. A. in Political Science & Philosophy, PGD in Gandhian Studies, Ph. D. and D. Lit.

Career
A well-known Indologist and the former Vice-Chancellor of CCS University Meerut, India, Kumar has been associated with several national and international academic, cultural, educational, peace and social bodies/institutions/organizations. As an International Professor and a Cultural Ambassador of India, he has delivered more than four hundred lectures at various institutions and universities of the world on subjects related to Asian values, civilization, culture, Gandhian philosophy, Indology, international co-operation and understanding, leadership,  way of life, women's empowerment, world peace, youth affairs etc.

As a Peace Worker, Kumar started Peace Review – an international journal of peace studies in 1998 and worked as its Editor-in-Chief. In 2001 he has started Global Peace –another international journal of philosophy, peace, education, culture and civilization. Besides, he has inspired hundred and thousands of people all over the world for their commitment towards non-violence by signing pledges.

Between 1993 and 2015 Ravindra Kumar has organised a number of seminars, symposiums and workshops at national and international level on subjects related to value education, religion and politics, non-violence and democracy, morality and ethics in public life, human values and rights, education, peace and development,  Gandhian philosophy.

Books

Religion and Word Peace (1993-2006)
Morality and Ethics in Public Life (1999)
Towards Peace, two-parts (2001-7)
Theory and Practice of Gandhian Non-Violence (2002-7)
Non-Violence and Its Philosophy (2003)
Five Thousand Years of Indian Culture (2003)
Fundamentals of Civilization (2006)
Sardar Vallabhbhai Patel: Life, Works and Views (2005–12)
Towards Buddha (2007), Gandhian Thought: New World, New Dimensions (2008)
India and Mahatma Gandhi (2009–10)
Peace Philosophy in Action (2010)
Resolving Conflicts: The Gandhian Way (2011)
Education, Peace and Development (2012)
Gandhi in Current Perspective (2012)
The Indian Way (2013)
The Gandhian Way: A Universal Method of Resolving Conflicts (2013)
Non-Violence and Peace Education, two-parts (2013)
Facets of Education in Global Perspective (2013-5)
Unveiling the Universality of Indology and Indian Philosophy (2015)
Value and Peace Education (2016)
Essays on Socio-Cultural Sensitization, Empowerment and Human Rights (2016)
Sanatana Dharma –The Vedic-Hindu Jeevan Marg (2016)
Gandhi Marg (2016)
Gandhi’s Vision of the World in the Light of Indian Philosophy (2018) 
Greatest Indians –a multi-volume series (2016-8).

Positions 
Teacher, Department of Political Science, SD College, Muzaffarnagar, Uttar Pradesh (1982-3), Research Representative/Senior Research Officer, Sardar Patel National Memorial, Ahmedabad/Sardar Patel Works Committee, New Delhi (1985–90),  Member Secretary and Chief Editor of Vithalbhai Patel Works Committee (1990–92), Vice Chancellor, CCS University, Meerut, India (1994), Visiting Professor, Department of Philosophy and Religion, Prince of Songkla University, Pattani Campus, Thailand (1996-2001), Visiting Professor/Scholar at more than one hundred Universities/Institutions of higher studies and research around the world including Ateneo de Manila University (Philippines), Universities of Thammasat, Silpakorn, Mahidol, Kasetsart and Chulalongkorn (Thailand), Universities of Malaya, Kuala Lumpur and Malaysia Science, Penang (Malaysia), Universities of Mandalay and Yangon (Myanmar), Udayana University, Bali (Indonesia), Institute Kern, Leiden University (The Netherlands), Universities of Aalborg, Aarhus, NIAS Copenhagen and Odense (Denmark), St. Petersburg State University (Russia), Jaume-I University, Castellon (Spain), University of Torino (Italy), University of Vienna (Austria), North Florida University, Jacksonville, Florida (USA), Universities of Autonomic Latin-American, Antioquia, EAFIT, Pontificia Bolivariana and Externado de Colombia (Columbia), Universidad de Especialidades Espíritu Santo –the UEES, Guayaquil (Ecuador, South America), University of Kwazulu-Natal, Durban (South Africa)(1995-2019), Ombudsman, Swami Vivekananda Subharati University, Meerut, India (since 2013), Patron/Chairman, Director and Coordinator for international relations of many universities and institutions of higher studies and research in India and other countries of Asia.

Memberships 
 
 Member, Executive Council, Meerut University, Meerut, India, between 1993 and 1994
 Member, Executive Council, MD University, Rohtak, India, between 1994 and 1996
 Vice-Chancellor, CCS University, India, 1994

 Member, Senate, Gandhigram Rural Institute Deemed University, Tamil Nadu, India, between 1994 and 1997
 Life Fellow, (United Writers’ Association), Chennai, Tamil Nadu, India since 1997
 Consultant to UNUP, CR., CA. for Gandhian Studies 2000
 Founder and Secretary General, World Peace Movement Trust since 2001
 Member, Gandhi-Information-Zentrum, Berlin, Germany since 2001
 Life Member, International Film & Television Research Centre, Noida, India since 2006
 Honorary Advisor, Peace Education Academy of Nepal, Kathmandu, Nepal since 2006
 Member, Global Initiative to End All Corporal Punishment of Children, London, UK since 2006
 Honorary Advisor, Institute For Inspiration & Self Development, Kolkata, India since 2006
 Member, Advisory Board, Media For Freedom, USA since 2007
 Member, Indian Language Newspapers Association (ILNA), India since 2009
 Member, Asia-Pacific Peace Research Association, since 2009
 Member, Action Asia, since 2009
 Patron, Stallion College for Engineering and Technology, Chhutmalpur, Saharanpur, India since 2010
 Member, Gandhi Serve Foundation, Germany since 2010
 Member, National Executive, Indian Language Newspapers Association (ILNA), India, between  2010 and 2012
 Patron, Ruminations –a bi-annual international journal for analysis and research in humanities and social sciences , India since 2010
 Member, Executive Council, Uttarakhand Sanskrit University, Haridwar (Uttarakhand), India, between 2011 and 2013
 Patron, The EDUQUEST –a bi-annually international-refereed journal in Education , JKC, Purulia, West Bengal, India since 2012
 Member, Advisory Board to Techno LEARN –a bi-annually international journal of educational technology , New Delhi, India since 2012
 Patron, LM Institute of Technology and Management, Lucknow, India since 2012
 Member Academic Council and the Coordinator for international affairs, Shridhar University (Rajasthan), India, between 2012 and 2017
 Founder Director, Institute of Indology and Oriental Studies,  Shridhar University (Rajasthan), India since 2012
 Coordinator for international relations for the universities and institutions of higher studies and research under the Baise-Chumphon and Krabi Sister’s Cities Projects, between 2012 and 2017
 The Ombudsman, Swami Vivekananda Subharati University, Meerut (UP), India and 17 other institutions along, since 2013
 Chairman of the Committee for Classification of Affiliated Colleges with the Uttrakhand Sanskrit University, Haridwar, 2013     
 Patron, International Centre of Nonviolence (ICON), Sydney, Australia since 2013
 Patron, The Ashram Gandhi Puri, Bali, Indonesia since 2014
 Patron, Adi Shankara Vedanta Pratishthanam, Bhubaneswar, Odisha, India since 2015  
 Advisor/Council Head and Convener, Gandhi Peace Foundation, Kathmandu, Nepal since 2018  
 Member Advisory Board of Acid Survivors & Women Welfare Foundation –ASWWF, India since 2019

Awards 

 1993: Meerut Ratna
 1998: Nirala Smriti Samman
 2001: Padma Shri for Literature and Education
 2003: Shan-I-Kaum
 2004: Shantidoot
 2005: Ambassador for Peace
 2006: Sardar Patel National Award
 2008: Master of Wisdom
 2010: Peace Messenger
 2010: Peace Envoy  
 2012: Soham Smarkam Award of Bharatiya Vidya Bhavan
 2012: The Buddha Ratna
 2013: Uttar Pradesh Ratna 
 2013: D. LIT. (Honoris Causa) 
 2013: Samaj Ratna 
 2014: The Gandhi Ratna
 2014: Shiksha Ratna
 2014: Gandhi Shiksha Ratna 
 2015: Sardar Patel Ratna 
 2015: SREIT Lifetime Achievement Award 
 2016: Vidyavachaspati 
 2017: Shivkumar Shastri Smriti Samman along with Hindi Bhasha Bhushan
 2017: Madyanirodhan Samman –the highest honour of Kerala Hindi Sahitya Academy
 2018: Gandhi Peace Honour 
 2018: Bharat Gaurav                                        * 2020: Buddhist Humanitarian Award.         * 2020: Gandhi Nobel Peace Award.              * 2021: Country's Pride

References

External links 

 World Security Network
 World Peace Movement
 The Danish Peace Academy
 Articles By Dr. Kumar    
 https://ravindrakumar.org
 https://www.blogger.com/blogger.g?blogID=879137459606926778#allposts

1959 births
Living people
People from Muzaffarnagar district
Indian political scientists
Indian magazine editors
Writers from Uttar Pradesh
Indian columnists
Indian Indologists
Recipients of the Padma Shri in literature & education
20th-century Indian biographers
Scientists from Uttar Pradesh
20th-century Indian educational theorists
Indian political writers
20th-century Indian non-fiction writers